Strays is an upcoming American comedy film directed and produced by Josh Greenbaum. The film stars Will Ferrell, Jamie Foxx, and Will Forte.

Strays is scheduled to be released in the United States on June 9, 2023, by Universal Pictures.

Premise
When a dog named Reggie (Will Ferrell) is abandoned in the streets by his owner, Doug (Will Forte), he teams up with other strays including a Boston Terrier named Bug (Jamie Foxx), an Australian Shepherd named Maggie (Isla Fisher), and a therapy Great Dane named Hunter (Randall Park) to get revenge on Doug, who never wanted him.

Cast
 Will Ferrell as the voice of Reggie
 Jamie Foxx as the voice of Bug
 Will Forte as Doug
 Isla Fisher as the voice of Maggie
 Randall Park as the voice of Hunter
 Josh Gad
 Harvey Guillén
 Rob Riggle
 Jamie Demetriou
 Brett Gelman
 Sofía Vergara

Production
In August 2019, Phil Lord and Christopher Miller signed a first-look deal with Universal Pictures. In May 2021, Universal acquired the rights to Strays, an adult comedy written by Dan Perrault, with Lord and Miller attached to produce alongside Erik Feig and Louis Leterrier. The film is a co-production between Picturestart and Rabbit Hole Productions. Filming began in September 2021 in Atlanta, Georgia. Production concluded by December 2021.

Release
The film is scheduled to be released in theaters on June 9, 2023.

References

External links
 
 

2023 computer-animated films
American animated comedy films
American films about revenge
American films with live action and animation
Films about dogs
Films directed by Josh Greenbaum
Films produced by Phil Lord and Christopher Miller
Universal Pictures animated films
Universal Pictures films
Upcoming English-language films
2020s English-language films
2020s American films